The Ruhr (German Ruhrgebiet) is an urban and industrial area in North Rhine-Westphalia, Germany. 

It may also refer to:

Ruhr (river), a river that runs through the area
Ruhr (film), 2009, by director James Benning
Ruhr, the German word for dysentery, an inflammatory disorder of the intestine
Ruhr (A 64), a former Rhein class replenishment ship of the German Navy
"Ruhr of India", valley of the Damodar River

See also
Rur, a river that flows through the Netherlands, Belgium and Germany
Rur (disambiguation)